Wojnowice may refer to:

 Wojnowice, Środa Śląska County in Lower Silesian Voivodeship (south-west Poland)
 Wojnowice, Wrocław County in Lower Silesian Voivodeship (south-west Poland)
 Wojnowice, Łódź Voivodeship (central Poland)
 Wojnowice, Opatów County in Świętokrzyskie Voivodeship (south-central Poland)
 Wojnowice, Ostrowiec County in Świętokrzyskie Voivodeship (south-central Poland)
 Wojnowice, Leszno County in Greater Poland Voivodeship (west-central Poland)
 Wojnowice, Nowy Tomyśl County in Greater Poland Voivodeship (west-central Poland)
 Wojnowice, Silesian Voivodeship (south Poland)
 Wojnowice, Opole Voivodeship (south-west Poland)
 Wojnowice, West Pomeranian Voivodeship (north-west Poland)